2036 Sheragul, provisional designation , is a rare-type Florian asteroid from the inner regions of the asteroid belt, approximately 7 kilometers in diameter. The asteroid was discovered on 22 September 1973, by Soviet astronomer Nikolai Chernykh at the Crimean Astrophysical Observatory in Nauchnij, on the Crimean peninsula. It was named after the Russian village of Sheragul in eastern Siberia.

Orbit and classification 

Sheragul is a member of the Flora family, one of the largest collisional populations of stony asteroids. It orbits the Sun in the inner main-belt at a distance of 1.8–2.7 AU once every 3 years and 4 months (1,229 days). Its orbit has an eccentricity of 0.19 and an inclination of 4° with respect to the ecliptic.

Physical characteristics 

Sheragul has been characterized as a rare A-type asteroid by Pan-STARRS photometric survey.

Diameter and albedo 

According to the surveys carried out by the Japanese Akari satellite and NASA's Wide-field Infrared Survey Explorer with its subsequent NEOWISE mission, Sheragul measures between 6.80 and 7.241 kilometers in diameter and its surface has an albedo between 0.300 and 0.3383.

The Collaborative Asteroid Lightcurve Link assumes an albedo of 0.24 – derived from 8 Flora, the largest member and namesake of its family – and subsequently calculates a larger diameter of 7.47 kilometers based on an absolute magnitude of 12.8.

Lightcurves and poles 

Between 2003 and 2014, a large number of rotational lightcurve of Sheragul were obtained from photometric observations by astronomer Maurice Clark at Rosemary Hill Observatory in Florida, and Preston Gott Observatory in Texas, respectively. Lightcurve analysis gave a rotation period of 5.4130 hours with a brightness variation of 0.58 magnitude.

The asteroid was also observed during an international study of Florian asteroids by European astronomers in October 2007. It gave a concurring period of 5.45 hours with an exceptionally high amplitude of 1.5 magnitude, indicating the body has a non-spheroidal shape.

Based on his many photometric observations, astronomer Maurice Clark also modeled the shape of Sheragul and obtained two spin axis with (306.0°, −35.8°) and (117.3°, −28.9°) in ecliptic coordinates (λ, β), respectively. His observations also suggest that the asteroid is in a retrograde rotation.

Naming 

This minor planet was named after the Russian village of Sheragul in Irkutsk Oblast, southeastern Siberia, approximately 400 kilometers northwest of Lake Baikal. The name also honors the people of this village, where Nikolai Chernykh spent his school years. The official  was published by the Minor Planet Center on 1 September 1978.

References

External links 
 Asteroid Lightcurve Database (LCDB), query form (info )
 Dictionary of Minor Planet Names, Google books
 Asteroids and comets rotation curves, CdR – Observatoire de Genève, Raoul Behrend
 Discovery Circumstances: Numbered Minor Planets (1)-(5000) – Minor Planet Center
 
 

 

002036
Discoveries by Nikolai Chernykh
Named minor planets
19730922